Perla  is a Mexican telenovela produced by TV Azteca and starred Silvia Navarro and Leonardo Garcia as protagonists.

Plot
In the world of power and money, no errors are permitted. Perla is a youth attending a prestigious college; sent there by her mother since a very small age and has never met her father. There, she meets and befriends Julieta Santiago and the two become close friends. Julieta is the heir of "Juvenile", a huge colossal company of cosmetics in Mexico. Julieta loves and has a son with Roberto Valderrama, who nevertheless betrays her and abandons her while she is pregnant. In a few time, Julieta dies in a car accident. Perla decides to take her place in the Santiago family.

Cast

Main cast
Silvia Navarro	... 	Perla / Julieta Santiago 
Leonardo Garcia	... 	Luis Roberto Valderrama

Secondary casts
Gina Romand Mercedes villain
Andrés García Jr.	... 	Alberto 'Junior' Valderrama
Paloma Woolrich	... 	Eugenia Martinez Kaufman villain
Jorge Lavat	... 	César
Rodolfo Arias	... 	Pablo, main villain
Roberto Medina	... 	Octavio, main villain
Irma Infante	... 	Patricia
Miguel Couturier	... 	Alberto
Mauricio Ferrari	... 	Enrique
Vanessa Acosta	... 	Gina Valderrama
Carmen Areu	... 	Otilia Santiago
Rodrigo Cachero	... 	Alexis Santiago
José Ramón Escoriza	... 	Felipe Legarreta, villain
Karla Llanos	... 	Julieta Santiago Sanchez
Cristina Alatorre	... 	Jazmín villain, turns good
Gerardo Acuña	... 	Bernardo
Simone Victoria	... 	Toña
Víctor González	... 	Hugo
Eugenio Montessoro	... 	Julio Alcántara
Lucía Muñoz	... 	Adriana
Gabriela Hassel	... 	Rosenda Santiago, villain

Tertiary casts
Michelle Barquín	... 	Enfermera
Roberto Carrera	... 	Hector
Ninel Conde
Martín Cuburu	... 	Benares
Carlos Alejandro Diaz	... 	Raymundo
Adriana Doblado	... 	Belén Sanchez
Cynthia Ele	... 	María
Elena Felgueres	... 	Adriana
Daniela Garmendia	... 	Josefina
Javier Guerrero	... 	Médico
Dieter Koll	... 	Marco
Miguel Manzano Jr.	... 	Germán
Socorro Miranda	... 	Mónica
Betty Monroe           ...     Guadalupe 'Lupita'''
Deborah Moralo	... 	SecretariaSergio Mayer Mori	... 	NeonatoEduardo Muñoz	... 	EnriquitoMariana Peñalva	... 	ReginaFlavio Peniche	... 	EvaroPalmira Pérez	... 	MarianaMaría Rebeca	... 	Matilde, main villainAna María Rebell	... 	RosaKarla Rico	... 	RecepcionistaIsabela Ripol	... 	Julietita SantiagoMaribel Rodríguez	... 	CristinaCuba Sanchez	... 	Jurista''
Maricarmen Sandoval

Theme song
Title: "Prohibido"
Singer: Octavio Cruz

References

1998 telenovelas
1998 Mexican television series debuts
1998 Mexican television series endings
Mexican telenovelas
TV Azteca telenovelas
Mexican television series based on Argentine television series
Spanish-language telenovelas